A tennis court is a venue where the sport of tennis is played.

Tennis court may also refer to:

 "Tennis Court" (song), 2013 song by Lorde

See also
 Tennis Court Road, Cambridge, England
 Tennis Court Oath (disambiguation)